Vernon Adair Benson (September 19, 1924 – January 20, 2014) was an infielder/outfielder, coach, scout and interim manager in American Major League Baseball. During his playing career, he stood 5'11" (180 cm) tall, weighed 180 pounds (82 kg), batted left-handed, and threw right-handed.

Playing career
Born in Granite Quarry, North Carolina, Benson attended Catawba College in nearby Salisbury. He debuted in the Majors with the Philadelphia Athletics in 1943 and had a second trial with the Mackmen in 1946, but most of his career would be spent in the organization of the St. Louis Cardinals. While he appeared in only 46 games for St. Louis between 1951–53, he was a fixture with the Cards' Rochester Red Wings and Columbus Red Birds Triple-A farm clubs as a player. Overall, Benson batted .202 in 104 MLB at bats over five seasons, with three home runs and 12 runs batted in. In his finest minor league season, 1951 at Columbus, he batted .308 with 18 home runs and 89 RBI.

Major League coach
He became a manager in the Redbird system in 1956 with the Winnipeg Goldeyes of the Class C Northern League. On July 6, 1961, he was promoted from manager of the Triple-A Portland Beavers to the Cardinals to serve as a Major League coach under new skipper Johnny Keane.

Benson worked with Keane through the Cards' 1964 World Championship, then moved to the New York Yankees when Keane switched to the Bombers (his 1964 World Series opponent) in 1965. But the Yankees were in a downward spiral at the time, finishing sixth in the '65 American League race. Then they won only four of their first 20 games in 1966, resulting in Keane's firing and Benson's resignation on May 7.

Two months later, on July 13, 1966, Benson returned to the National League as a coach for fellow North Carolinian Dave Bristol, newly appointed pilot of the Cincinnati Reds. He spent the remainder of his MLB career in the Senior Circuit, as a coach for the Reds (through 1969), the Cardinals again (1970–1975), Atlanta Braves (1976–77), and San Francisco Giants (1980), working in the latter two posts under Bristol once again. He managed the Syracuse Chiefs, Triple-A affiliate of the Toronto Blue Jays, in 1978–79. He won three playoff championships in the minor leagues, in: the Northern League (with Winnipeg) in 1957; the Texas League (with Tulsa) in 1960; and the International League (with Syracuse) in 1979. After his on-field career ended, Benson returned to the Cardinals as a scout.

He also managed the Braves for one game in  under unusual circumstances. After the club lost 21 of its first 29 games, Dave Bristol was sent on a "scouting trip" on May 10 and replaced by the team's owner, Ted Turner, a world-class yachtsman and television executive who had no baseball experience. After Turner lost his only game as the team's skipper on the 11th, National League president Chub Feeney told Turner that managers cannot own financial interest in a club. When Turner's appeal to Commissioner Bowie Kuhn was turned down, Benson stepped in for one game—which he won, 6–1 over the Pittsburgh Pirates on May 12—before Bristol was rehired for the remainder of the season.

Death
Benson died on January 20, 2014, at the age of 89.

See also
 List of St. Louis Cardinals coaches

References

Balzer, Howard M., ed. The Baseball Register, 1980 edition. St. Louis: The Sporting News.

External links

Venezuelan Baseball League

1924 births
2014 deaths
Atlanta Braves coaches
Atlanta Braves managers
Baseball players from North Carolina
Cincinnati Reds coaches
Columbus Red Birds players
Houston Buffaloes players
Lácteos de Pastora players
Major League Baseball first base coaches
Major League Baseball infielders
Major League Baseball outfielders
Major League Baseball third base coaches
New York Yankees coaches
Omaha Cardinals players
People from Granite Quarry, North Carolina
People from Salisbury, North Carolina
Philadelphia Athletics players
Portland Beavers managers
Rochester Red Wings players
St. Louis Cardinals coaches
St. Louis Cardinals players
St. Louis Cardinals scouts
San Francisco Giants coaches
Santa Marta (baseball club) players
Savannah Indians players
Syracuse Chiefs managers
Toronto Maple Leafs (International League) players
Tulsa Oilers (baseball) players
Winnipeg Goldeyes players
Winston-Salem Red Birds players
American expatriate baseball people in the Dominican Republic
American expatriate baseball players in Canada
American expatriate baseball players in Venezuela